BorgBuss was a bus company that operated in Fredrikstad, Sarpsborg and Hvaler, Norway between 2004 and 2013. The company itself was founded in 1998 and is still existing, but has no operations anymore. The company is owned 100% by Nettbuss.

References

Bus companies of Viken
Former subsidiaries of Vy Buss